The United States Army Tank-automotive and Armaments Command (TACOM), and its subordinate Life Cycle Management Command (LCMC), headquartered at the Detroit Arsenal in Warren, Michigan, is part of the United States Army Materiel Command (AMC).

The entire complex that houses TACOM's headquarters is located on what is known as the Detroit Arsenal. TACOM has subordinate installations located at Anniston Army Depot in Alabama, Red River Army Depot in Texas, Sierra Army Depot in California, and Watervliet Arsenal in New York, and has significant numbers of personnel located at Rock Island Arsenal, Illinois, and Natick Soldier Center, Massachusetts.

The Detroit Arsenal also houses the laboratories and facilities of TACOM's partner for ground vehicle technology and engineering, the United States Army CCDC Ground Vehicle Systems Center (GVSC), formerly known as United States Army Tank Automotive Research, Development and Engineering Center (TARDEC), an element of the United States Army Combat Capabilities Development Command (CCDC).

Defense Acquisition University (DAU) has a branch at TACOM, which assists with the training and certification of employees in necessary logistics and acquisition methods for the U.S. federal government. This training and certification is made possible by many highly trained instructors on TACOM and elsewhere, providing lectures and briefings on these crucial logistic and acquisition areas.

Ground Combat Vehicle 

The BCT Ground Combat Vehicle Program is overseen by TACOM.

List of commanding generals

References

External links
 TACOM website
 Defense Acquisition University
 GVSC Website
 TARDEC website

Tank-automotive and Armaments Command
Macomb County, Michigan